Zornia vaughaniana is a species of flowering plant in the family Fabaceae. It is found only in Mauritius. Its natural habitats are rocky shores and sandy shores.

References

vaughaniana
Endemic flora of Mauritius
Critically endangered plants
Taxonomy articles created by Polbot